Provincial Deputation of Almería is the provincial government of the province of Almería, in the autonomous community of Andalusia, Spain.

From 2003 to 2007 it was presided by José Añez (PP), and from 2007 to 2011 by Juan Carlos Usero López (PSOE).

References

Bibliography

External links

 
 

Almeria
Institutions of Andalusia